Micranthus is a genus of flowering plants in the family Iridaceae. The entire genus is endemic to Cape Province in South Africa.

The genus name is derived from the Greek words micro, meaning "small", and anthos, meaning "flower".

 Species
 Micranthus alopecuroides (L.) Eckl., Topogr. Verz. Pflanzensamml. Ecklon: 43 (1827)
 Micranthus plantagineus Eckl., Topogr. Verz. Pflanzensamml. Ecklon: 43 (1827)
 Micranthus tubulosus (Burm.f.) N.E.Br., Bull. Misc. Inform. Kew 1929: 133 (1929)

References

Iridaceae genera
Flora of South Africa
Iridaceae